Crawford County High School may refer to:

 Crawford County High School (Indiana) in Marengo, Indiana, and also known as Crawford County Junior-Senior High School
 Crawford County High School (Georgia) in Roberta, Georgia